Anthony John Valentine Obinna (born 26 June 1946 in Emekukwu, Imo State, Nigeria) is a Nigerian priest and the archbishop of Owerri from 26 March 1994 until 6 March 2022.

Biography
Ordained as a priest on 1972, he incardinated in the Diocese of Owerri.

John Paul II appointed him as the bishop of Owerri diocese in 1993. He was consecrated by bishop Carlo Maria Viganò on the following 4 September. On 26 March 1994 he was appointed as the first archbishop of Owerri.

References

External links 

 Page of Saurímo Archdiocese on Website of Episcopal Angolan Conference

20th-century Roman Catholic bishops in Nigeria
Living people
1946 births
Igbo people
Nigerian Roman Catholics
People from Imo State
Roman Catholic archbishops of Owerri
Roman Catholic bishops of Owerri